The 1939 Cupa României Final was the sixth final of Romania's most prestigious football cup competition. It was disputed between Sportul Studențesc București and Rapid București, and was won by Rapid București after a game with 2 goals. It was the fourth cup for Rapid, and the third of six consecutive successes.

Match details

See also 
List of Cupa României finals

References

External links
Romaniansoccer.ro

1939
Cupa
Romania